Niskayuna Reformed Church is a historic Dutch Reformed church located at 3041 Troy-Schenectady Road in Niskayuna in Schenectady County, New York. It was built in 1852 and is a brick, gable-roofed building in the Greek Revival style. It has brick pilasters and a brick frieze around the entire building. It features a two-stage central tower consisting of a square section surmounted by an open hexagonal belfry. The adjacent cemetery contains burials dating to the late 18th century. Another reformed church at Lisha Kill, built in 1854, is very similar in design.

The church was added to the National Register of Historic Places in 1979.

Gallery

References

External links

Churches on the National Register of Historic Places in New York (state)
Historic American Buildings Survey in New York (state)
Greek Revival church buildings in New York (state)
Churches completed in 1852
19th-century Reformed Church in America church buildings
Churches in Schenectady County, New York
National Register of Historic Places in Schenectady County, New York
1852 establishments in New York (state)